Ned Wever (born Edward Hooper Weaver; April 27, 1902 – May 6, 1984) was an actor on stage and on old-time radio. Garyn G. Roberts wrote in his book, Dick Tracy and American Culture: Morality and Mythology, Text and Context, "Wever's most famous role was probably that of H.C. McNeile's British detective and adventurer Bulldog Drummond for the program of the same name."

Early years 
The son of a New York attorney, Wever was born on April 27, 1902, in New York City. He graduated from the Pawling School and Princeton University, where he was president of the Triangle Club dramatic organization in his senior year and was a member of the staff of The Daily Princetonian newspaper and the Nassau Literary Magazine.

Radio 
Wever's roles on radio programs included those shown in the table below.

He also had leads on True Detective, The True Story Hour, Angel of Mercy and Manhattan Mother and was heard frequently on The Wonder Show, Grand Central Station, Perry Mason and The Cavalcade of America.

Stage 
Wever's initial professional stage work came with Stewart Walker's stock theater company in Indianapolis, Indiana. His Broadway credits include Days to Come (1936), The Second Little Show (1930) and The Grab Bag (1924).

Musical composition 
In his book, The Great Radio Soap Operas, Jim Cox called Wever "as talented a musician as he was an actor". Cox added, "He composed show tunes for Broadway productions featuring Billy Rose and Ed Wynn." Wever's compositions included "Spellbound", "I Can't Resist You", "Trouble in Paradise" and "Trust in Me".

Television 
Wever was credited with more than 70 appearances on television programs, including Alfred Hitchcock Presents, Bonanza, Perry Mason, Get Smart and The George Burns and Gracie Allen Show.

Personal life 
Wever and his wife, Carla, had two daughters, Patricia and Pamela.

Death 
Wever died of heart failure May 6, 1984, in a convalescent home in Laguna Hills, California.

Filmography

References

External links 

1902 births
1984 deaths
American male film actors
American male radio actors
American male television actors
20th-century American male actors